Chungju High School is a public secondary boys' school in Chungju-city, Chungcheongbuk-do, South Korea.  It is located on 37 Yeseong Gil, (558 Hoam-dong).  The 8th Secretary-General of the United Nations, Ban Ki-moon, graduated from the school.

Motto
최고(最高), 최선(最善), 최대(最大) (The Highest, the Utmost, the Best)

This meaning of the motto is The Highest Goals, the Utmost Efforts, the Best Results

Symbol
 Mascot : Tiger
 Tree : Maidenhair tree
 Flower : Korean Forsythia

School event
 Mi-eul Festival()
 Held in May each year.

Notable alumni
 Ban Ki-moon - eighth Secretary-General of the United Nations
 Hong Soon-young - 28th Minister of Unification in Republic of Korea
 Kim Ho-bok -  fourth Mayor of Chungju City
 Lee Hyung-geun - ROK Army general and diplomat
 Lee In-young - politician
 Shin Kyung-rim - poet
 Yoo Jong-Ho - literary critic
 Lee Kyeong-yeong - actor.

External links 
 Chungju High School 
 Chungcheongbuk-do Office of Education 

Chungju
Educational institutions established in 1940
High schools in South Korea
Schools in North Chungcheong Province
Boys' schools in South Korea
1940 establishments in Korea